Lake Evella Airport  is an airport in Gapuwiyak, Northern Territory, Australia. In 2004 the airstrip was sealed. The airport received $293,904 for security updates in 2006.

Airlines and destinations

See also
 List of airports in the Northern Territory

References

Airports in the Northern Territory